Kaloula assamensis, also known as Assamese balloon frog or Assam narrow-mouth toad, is a species of narrow-mouthed frogs found in Assam, Arunachal Pradesh, and West Bengal in northeastern India.

Range
In Sonitpur District, Assam, Kaloula assamensis was recorded in Majbat, Nameri National Park, and Orang National Park. It was also found in Bongaigaon, western Assam; Pakhui Wildlife Sanctuary, East Kameng District, Arunachal Pradesh; and Bong Basti village, Chilapata Range, West Bengal. It may also be found in southern Bhutan.

References

External links
Kaloula assamensis at novataxa.blogspot.com

assamensis
Frogs of India
Endemic fauna of India
Amphibians described in 2005
Taxa named by Indraneil Das